Total Film is a British film magazine published 13 times a year (published monthly and a summer issue is added every year since issue 91, 2004, which is published between July and August issue) by Future Publishing. The magazine was launched in 1997 and offers a cinema, DVD and Blu-ray news, reviews, and features. Total Film is available both in print and interactive iPad editions.

In 2014, it was announced online that Total Film would be merging into GamesRadar+, alongside SFX, Edge and Computer and Video Games.

Features
Each month, Total Film provides a range of features, from spotlight interviews with actors and directors to the making of on-set pieces for new and future releases. Each issue always includes the "Total Film Interview", which is a six-page in-depth chat with an actor or director, along with a critique of their body of work.

Key sections within the magazine
 Dialogue The section where readers can interact with the magazine, this contains readers' letters, emails, and feedback from the magazine's social media followers (TF'''s Forum, Facebook, and Twitter). Each month, TF offers a DVD for each published missive. A regular feature within Dialogue includes Office Spaced where snippets of conversation from the TF office are shared.

 Buzz The Total Film news section, providing details on upcoming films, includes first-look photos, on-set visits, and exclusive "sneak peeks". Regular features include: "Ever Met Tom Cruise?" where a behind-the-scenes person is interviewed, e.g. a stuntwoman or a casting director; "You Talkin' To Me?" where stars answer questions posed as famous film quotes and "Red Light, Green Light" for what is trending upwards in terms of interest and what is not in the film industry. Also included is the "60-Second Screenplay", which is a cut-down, humorous version of a movie script.

 Agenda Billed as being "for the sharper movie fan", this section often previews more eclectic and less mainstream releases and players. Richard Ayoade from The IT Crowd writes a column for "Agenda".

 Screen The main cinema reviews section, with every new movie for that month reviewed and rated. Major releases receive comprehensive coverage, with a star rating out of five, the magazine's own "Predicted Interest Curve"—a graph that demonstrates which moments of a film are likely to hold the viewer's attention and a short "Verdict". Also briefly listed are similar recommendations under "See this if you liked..." Smaller films receive a concise review and rating. The end of the section is devoted to the current US and UK box office charts, an irreverent flashback to an old issue and summaries of any films that were not shown to journalists in time for that month's print deadline.

 Lounge TFs home entertainment guide, including reviews of the latest DVDs and Blu-rays, as well as some games, soundtracks and books. Regular features include "Is It Just Me?", where a TF writer gets to rant about a particular (often controversial) film-related point of view, with readers then given the right to reply via the TF Forum or website; "Instant Expert" which gives a rundown of the key facts you need to know about an actor, director or movie genre; and "TF Loves", which picks out a certain scene or character rated by the magazine.

Foreign editions
Licensed local editions of Total Film are released in many countries, including Turkey, Russia, Serbia, Croatia, Indonesia, plus many others.

Online presenceTotal Films online presence includes the website,  forum & digital edition, as well as pages on Facebook, Twitter and Tumblr. There is also a Total Film iPhone app.

 Totalfilm.com  Sections on the website include news, reviews, features, trailers and video, films coming soon, competitions, screening club and magazine. News is uploaded throughout the day; reviews are uploaded as they come in; features are updated daily; trailers and video and films coming soon are updated as soon as new film information becomes available. The website contains a database of every movie review featured in the magazine. Users of the website can subscribe to a weekly newsletter, featuring a 10-point rundown of the week's essential news, reviews and features, as well as competitions and free screenings RSS Feeds are available for: news, reviews, features and films coming soon. Users can also comment on any of the articles included on the website, as well as retweeting on Twitter and sharing on Facebook. Traffic on Totalfilm.com is growing exponentially, with 2.5 million unique users and 40 million page views a month. Its social media presence also continues to grow, with a highly engaged audience of over 450,000 followers across Facebook, Twitter and Tumblr.

 Forum  The TF Forum existed between 2004 and 2013 before being shut down by the magazine. It had a loyal group of long-time users and during its time was a thriving community, attracting new members for chat and interaction on a variety of subjects. 

 Facebook and Twitter  Bespoke content is uploaded to Facebook and Twitter throughout the day. Posts include news stories and alerts for when a new review or trailer has been posted.

 Tumblr  TFs official blog is located at Tumblr. Bespoke content for Reviews, News, Features, Trailers, Posters, Office Talk and Covers is posted throughout the day.

 iPhone app Total Film launched its iPhone app in August 2010. The app allows users to read the latest film news, live search TFs database of over 8,000 reviews, read daily film features, save favourite articles, find the nearest cinema, look up showtimes and watch high quality trailers.

On iPadTotal Film has been available in an interactive version for iPad since April 2012. Readers can interact with the pages, watch trailers and bespoke videos from photoshoots and link to buy DVDs from iTunes.

The Total Film'' iPad app won Film Magazine Of The Year at the 2012 Digital Magazine Awards. The judges said: "Full of tablet-specific features, great content, and interactivity. This a great read that makes the most of the digital format, a fantastic digital magazine."

See also
 List of film periodicals

References

External links
 

1997 establishments in the United Kingdom
Film magazines published in the United Kingdom
Magazines established in 1997
Mass media in Bath, Somerset
Monthly magazines published in the United Kingdom